Rotherham by-election may refer to:

1892 Rotherham by-election
1899 Rotherham by-election
1910 Rotherham by-election
1916 Rotherham by-election
1917 Rotherham by-election
1933 Rotherham by-election
1976 Rotherham by-election
1994 Rotherham by-election
2012 Rotherham by-election